Charles Rochemont Aikin (1775–1847) was an English doctor and chemist.

Biography
He was born at Warrington, Lancashire into a distinguished literary family of prominent Unitarians. His father, Dr John Aikin, was a medical doctor, historian, and author. His grandfather, also called John Aikin (1713–1780), was a Unitarian scholar and theological tutor, closely associated with Warrington Academy. His sister Lucy (1781–1864) was a historical writer; one brother Arthur (1773–1854) was a chemist, mineralogist, and scientific writer; another, Edmund, was an architect.

He was adopted as a child by his aunt, Anna Laetitia Barbauld, a prominent poet, essayist, literary critic, editor, and children's author. She and her husband Rochemont ran a dissenting academy (a sort of boarding school for the sons of Dissenters) at Palgrave in Suffolk; Charles was educated at their Palgrave Academy. He is the "little Charles" of Mrs. Barbauld's Lessons for Children.

From an early age he devoted himself to science, and aided his eldest brother Arthur in his first published works and public lectures. Subsequently he applied himself to medicine, became a member of the Royal College of Surgeons, and was chosen secretary of the Medical and Chirurgical Society of London. He married Anne, daughter of the Rev. Gilbert Wakefield; one of their children was the writer and memoirist Anna Letitia Le Breton. Aikin died at his house in Bloomsbury Square, central London, on 20 March 1847.

Publications
Concise View of all the most important Facts that have hitherto appeared respecting the Cow Pox,’ 1800.
Dictionary of Chemistry and Mineralogy, 1807–1814, which he wrote in conjunction with his eldest brother.
Rees's Cyclopædia, articles (topics unknown)

References

1775 births
1847 deaths
19th-century British chemists
19th-century English medical doctors
19th-century English writers
People from Warrington
Anna Laetitia Barbauld